Gorson is a surname. Notable people with the surname include:

Aaron Harry Gorson (1872–1933), American artist
Arthur Gorson, American film and record producer

See also
Alternate spelling of Corson (demon)
Gordon (surname)
Lorson
Morson